The Quadrilatero della moda (literally "fashion square"), or Via Montenapoleone fashion district, is a high-class shopping district in the centre of the Italian city of Milan, characterised by the presence of numerous boutiques and related retail outlets which represent most of the world's major fashion houses.

The sides of the square, located to the south of the arches of Porta Nuova, are formed by Via Montenapoleone (SW), Via Manzoni (NW), Via della Spiga (NE), and Corso Venezia (SE).

Streets inside this area include Via Borgospesso, Via Santo Spirito, Via Gesù, Via Sant'Andrea, Via Bagutta, and Via Baggutino. The zone extends in practice also to the north-west of Via Manzoni with Via Pisoni, and to the south and west of Via Montenapoleone with Corso Giacomo Matteotti (this last meets Corso Venezia at Piazza San Babila), Piazza Meda, Via San Pietro all'Orto, and Via Verri.

Streets and squares

Corso Giacomo Matteotti
Fashion shops include:
Abercrombie & Fitch

Corso Venezia

Piazza Meda
Fashion shops include:
Hugo Boss
Calvin Klein

Piazza San Babila
Fashion shops include:
Bagatt
Boggi
Guess
Gusella
Nadine
North Sails
Sisley
Valextra

Via Bigli
Scappino

Via Borgospesso
Fashion shops include:
Altomani & Sons
Andrea Pfister
Antichità Silbernagl
Cyrus Company
daDriade
Galleria Silva
Giuliano Fujwara
Laura Biagiotti
Pinco Pallino
Tween DdM
Versace Homme

Via della Spiga

Via Manzoni

Via Montenapoleone
Fashion shops include:

Gianfranco Lotti

Via Pisoni
Fashion shops include:
Armani Casa
Armani Privè
Poltrona Frau

Via San Pietro all'Orto
Fashion shops include:
Jimmy Choo
Bagutta

Via Sant'Andrea

Restelli Guanti

Via Santo Spirito
Fashion shops include:
Borbonese
Balenciaga
Stella McCartney

Via Verri
Fashion shops include:
Alexander McQueen
Baldinini
Berluti
Burberry
Canali
DSquared²
Etro Profumi
Gucci
Jil Sander
John Richmond
Nautica
Oxford
Tom Ford
Zegna

See also

List of upscale shopping districts

References

Shopping districts and streets in Italy
Districts of Milan
Garment districts
Tourist attractions in Milan
Italian fashion
Jewellery districts
Culture in Milan